is a private university in Takasaki, Gunma, Japan, established in 2001. The predecessor of the school was founded in 1906.

External links

 Official website 

Educational institutions established in 1906
Private universities and colleges in Japan
Universities and colleges in Gunma Prefecture
1906 establishments in Japan
Takasaki, Gunma